Lake Khasan or Lake Hassan is a small lake in Khasansky District, Primorsky Krai of Russia, located southeast of Posyet Bay, on the border with North Korea and China,  southwest of Vladivostok. The Tanbogatyi River flows from the lake. The lake, described as "the tight corner where the territories of Korea, Manchuria, and Russia meet", was the site of the Battle of Lake Khasan in summer 1938. The lake is near Fangchuan, China.

See also
Khasan (urban-type settlement)
Battle of Lake Khasan

References

External links
Topographic map

Khasan
North Korea–Russia border
Khasan